The Great Little Trains of Wales (Welsh: Trenau Bach Arbennig Cymru) is the name of a joint marketing scheme formed in 1970 to promote some of the narrow gauge railways of Wales and encourage visitors to Wales. As well as marketing the railways, the scheme allows visitors to purchase a discount card, allowing reduced rates on all the lines.

As of 2021, there are twelve railways in the scheme.

See also
 Britain's Great Little Railways
 Heritage Railway Association
 British narrow gauge railways

References

External links
Great Little Trains of Wales website

 
 
Marketing boards
Tourist attractions in Wales